Josphat Gitonga Kabugi  is a Kenyan politician and was the Pioneer Deputy Governor of Laikipia County  between 2013–2017. He was the running mate of Joshua Irungu and they clinched the gubernatorial seat after a landslide win in the 2013 Laikipia local elections on a TNA ticket.

Early life
He went to Nanyuki Primary School, then went to Nanyuki High School and then Strathmore School.

Family
Gitonga is married to Purity Gitonga, and they have three children.

References

1966 births
Living people
Kenyan politicians